The term General Service refers to a collection of Directorates-General and Services within the European Commission that provide services to the policy-making DGs.  They are not policy-making themselves.

Structure
 European Anti-Fraud Office (OLAF)
 Eurostat
 Communication
 Publications Office
 Secretariat General

External links
 European Commission DGs and Services

 
General Services